"Nights of Pleasure" is the 12th single by English R&B band, Loose Ends, from their third studio album, Zagora. It was released in November 1986 by Virgin Records and was produced by Loose Ends' longtime collaborator Nick Martinelli.

Track listing
7” Single: VS919 
 "Nights Of Pleasure (7" Mix)" 3.18
 "Let's Rock (7" Remix)" 3.42 - remix by Carl 'Macca' McIntosh & Steve Nichol

12” Single: VS919-12
 "Nights Of Pleasure (12" Full Length Version / Nick Martinelli Mix)" 5.33
 "Let's Rock (Full Length Version / Steve Nichol & Macca Mix)" 6.11
 "Nights Of Pleasure (Dub Version)" 4.50

12” Single: VSD919-12 - 'Special DJ Pleasure Pack'
 "Nights Of Pleasure (Nick Martinelli Mix)" 5.33
 "Let's Rock (Full Length Version / Steve Nichol & Macca Mix)" 6.11
 "Nights Of Pleasure (Dancing Danny Dee Remix)" 6.00
 "Nights Of Pleasure (Dancing Danny Dee Dub)" 4.50

2nd 12” Single: VS819-13 
 "Nights Of Pleasure (12" Mix)"
 "Let's Rock (Full Length Version / Steve Nichol & Macca Mix)" 6.11
 "Johnny Broadhead"
 "Slow Down (12" Mix)"

Some copies of 7" came with free cassette 'The Baksheesh Mixes' VSC919
 "Gonna Make You Mine (Westside Mix)" 5.45  *
 "Choose Me (Dave 'The Blade' Edit)" 5.58
 "Silent Talking (Album Mix)" 5.02
 "Nights Of Pleasure (7" Mix)" 3.29
 "Let's Rock (7" Remix)" 3.44

* 'Gonna Make You Mine (Westside Remix)' was released on CD in 1992 on the 'Tighten Up Volume 1' remix project. It was remixed by Dancin' Danny D & Godwin Logie.

Charts

References

External links
 Nights of Pleasure (1986) at Discogs.

1986 singles
Loose Ends (band) songs
Song recordings produced by Nick Martinelli
Songs written by Carl McIntosh (musician)
Songs written by Jane Eugene
Songs written by Steve Nichol
1986 songs
Virgin Records singles